The 2021–22 Biathlon World Cup (BWC) was a multi-race series over a season of biathlon, organised by the International Biathlon Union. The season started on 27 November 2021 in Östersund, Sweden and ended on 20 March 2022 in Oslo Holmenkollen, Norway.

Norwegians Johannes Thingnes Bø and Tiril Eckhoff were the defending overall champions from the 2020–21 season.

For the first time in the history of the Biathlon World Cup, the competition will be held in Estonia, specifically in Otepää.

Due to the Russian invasion of Ukraine, Russian and Belarusian biathletes are only allowed to compete under a neutral flag since the competition in Kontiolahti. Their performances are not included in the previous classifications of their countries. Previously, the Ukrainian national team announced the withdrawal from the biathlon competition by the end of the season.

On 2 March 2022, IBU announced that Russian and Belarusian biathletes are banned from IBU events.

Polish biathlete Magdalena Gwizdoń starting in the sprint in Otepää broke the all-time record of the World Cup (starting in her 27th season). The previous record for starting in 26 seasons was held by Ole Einar Bjørndalen.

Calendar 

Below is the IBU World Cup calendar for the 2021–22 season. The 2022 Olympic Games events are not included into the Biathlon World Cup score.

Men

Calendar

Relay – 4 x 7.5 km

Standings

Overall

Under 25

Individual

Sprint

Pursuit

Mass start

Relay

Nation

Women

Calendar

Relay – 4 x 6 km

Standings

Overall

Under 25

Individual

Sprint

Pursuit

Mass start

Relay

Nation

Mixed Relay

Rankings

Podium table by nation 
Table showing the World Cup podium places (gold–1st place, silver–2nd place, bronze–3rd place) by the countries represented by the athletes.

Points distribution 
The table shows the number of points won in the 2021–22 Biathlon World Cup for men and women. Relay events do not impact individual rankings.

Achievements 
First World Cup career victory 

Men
 Johannes Kühn (30), in his 9th season – Stage 3 Sprint in Hochfilzen
 Sivert Guttorm Bakken (23), in his 2nd season – Stage 10 Mass Start in Oslo Holmenkollen

Women
 Hanna Sola (25), in her 5th season – Stage 3 Sprint in Hochfilzen
 Elvira Öberg (22), in her 3rd season – Stage 4 Pursuit in Annecy-Le Grand-Bornand

First World Cup podium 

Men
 Anton Smolski (24), in his 5th season – Stage 3 Sprint in Hochfilzen – 3rd place
 Filip Fjeld Andersen (22), in his 2nd season – Stage 4 Sprint in Annecy-Le Grand-Bornand – 3rd place
 Said Karimulla Khalili (23), in his 3rd season – Stage 7 Individual in Antholz-Anterselva – 3rd place
 Sivert Guttorm Bakken (23), in his 2nd season – Stage 9 Mass Start in Otepää – 3rd place

Women
 Kristina Reztsova (25), in her 3rd season – Stage 4 Mass Start in Annecy-Le Grand-Bornand– 3rd place
 Mona Brorsson (31), in her 10th season – Stage 7 Individual in Antholz-Anterselva – 3rd place
 Stina Nilsson (28), in her 2nd season – Stage 8 Sprint in Kontiolahti – 3rd place
 Vanessa Voigt (24), in her 2nd season – Stage 9 Sprint in Otepää – 2nd place

Number of wins this season (in brackets are all-time wins) 

Men

 Quentin Fillon Maillet – 8 (14) 
 Sturla Holm Lægreid – 2 (9)
 Vetle Sjåstad Christiansen – 2 (3)
 Sebastian Samuelsson – 2 (3)
 Johannes Thingnes Bø – 1 (52)
 Alexandr Loginov – 1 (4)
 Émilien Jacquelin – 1 (3)
 Benedikt Doll – 1 (3)
 Erik Lesser – 1 (3)
 Anton Babikov – 1 (2)
 Johannes Kühn – 1 (1)
 Sivert Guttorm Bakken – 1 (1)

Women

 Marte Olsbu Røiseland – 6 (15) 
 Elvira Öberg – 4 (4)
 Tiril Eckhoff – 3 (29)
 Justine Braisaz-Bouchet – 2 (4)
 Dorothea Wierer – 1 (13)
 Denise Herrmann – 1 (8)
 Hanna Öberg – 1 (6)
 Julia Simon – 1 (4)
 Markéta Davidová – 1 (3)
 Lisa Theresa Hauser – 1 (3)
 Hanna Sola – 1 (1)

Retirements 
The following notable biathletes retired during or after the 2021–22 season:

Men
 Julian Eberhard
 Tobias Eberhard
 Pjotr Karel Dielen
 
 Sergey Bocharnikov
 Dimitar Gerdzhikov
 Scott Gow
 
 Tomáš Krupčík
 Milan Žemlička
 Kalev Ermits
 Simon Desthieux
 Martin Perrillat-Bottonet
 Hugo Rivail
 Vinny Fountain
 Florian Hollandt
 Erik Lesser
 Thomas Bormolini
 Dominik Windisch
 
 Kazuki Baisho
 Tsukasa Kobonoki
 Shohei Kodama
 
 Roberts Slotiņš
 Håvard Gutubø Bogetveit
 
 
 Šimon Bartko
 Matej Baloga
 Klemen Bauer
 Damir Rastić
 Torstein Stenersen 
   Eligius Tambornino
   Benjamin Weger
   Martin Jäger
 Serhiy Semenov
 
 Leif Nordgren

Women
 Christina Rieder
 Megan Bankes
 Darya Sepandj
 Eva Puskarčíková
 Natalie Jurcova
 Kadri Lehtla	
 Anaïs Bescond
 Amanda Lightfoot
 Franziska Hildebrand
 Maren Hammerschmidt
 Karolin Horchler
 Irene Lardschneider
 Sari Maeda
 Kirari Tanaka
 Yurie Tanaka
 Hilde Fenne 
 
 Mun Ji-hee
 Kim Seon-su 
 Ana Larisa Cotrus
 
 
 Ekaterina Glazyrina
 
 
 Olga Podchufarova
 
 Veronika Machyniaková
 Selina Gasparin
 Ingela Andersson
 Elisabeth Högberg
 Olga Abramova
 
 Vita Semerenko
 Yuliya Zhuravok
 Susan Dunklee
 Clare Egan
 
 Madeleine Phaneuf

See also 
2021–22 Biathlon IBU Cup

Notes

References

External links 

 IBU official site

Biathlon World Cup
World Cup
World Cup